"Bodysnatchers" is a song by the English rock band Radiohead, from their seventh album In Rainbows (2007). In May 2008, it was released alongside the song "House of Cards" as a promotional single in the United Kingdom. "Bodysnatchers" was later serviced to United States modern rock radio by ATO Records in May 2008. It peaked at number eight on the Billboard Hot Modern Rock Tracks chart, Radiohead's highest placement since "Creep" in 1993.

Recording
Singer Thom Yorke and guitarist Jonny Greenwood debuted "Bodysnatchers" in May 2006 at their performance for the Big Ask at KOKO in London. Radiohead recorded it with producer Nigel Godrich at Tottenham House, a dilapidated country house in Marlborough, Wiltshire. Yorke said: "You can definitely hear the atmosphere of the place on [Bodysnatchers] ... 'Bodysnatchers' is the one live track on the record where we're all playing together."

Composition 
Yorke described the song as a combination of the German band Neu! and "dodgy hippy rock", likening it to the Australian band Wolfmother. He said it was inspired by Victorian ghost stories, the 1970s satire The Stepford Wives and the feeling of "your physical consciousness trapped without being able to connect fully with anything else".

Release
In preparation for the physical release of In Rainbows, ATO Records and sister label Side One Recordings serviced "Bodysnatchers" as a single from the album to American radio stations. ATO was chosen as the band's record label for American releases. "Bodysnatchers" gained substantial airplay on modern rock radio stations and reached number eight on the Billboard Modern Rock Tracks chart in February 2008. It was Radiohead's highest-charting song on the chart since "Creep" peaked at number two in 1993. A performance of "Bodysnatchers" was included on the 2008 live video In Rainbows – From the Basement.

Personnel
Adapted from the In Rainbows liner notes.

Radiohead
 Colin Greenwood
 Jonny Greenwood
 Ed O'Brien
 Philip Selway
 Thom Yorke

Production
 Nigel Godrich – production, mixing, engineering
 Richard Woodcraft – engineering
 Hugo Nicolson – engineering
 Dan Grech-Marguerat – engineering
 Graeme Stewart – preproduction
 Bob Ludwig – mastering

Artwork
 Stanley Donwood
 Dr Tchock

Charts

References

2007 songs
2008 singles
Radiohead songs
Song recordings produced by Nigel Godrich
Songs written by Thom Yorke
Songs written by Colin Greenwood
Songs written by Jonny Greenwood
Songs written by Philip Selway
Songs written by Ed O'Brien
ATO Records singles